"Suze (The Cough Song)"  is an instumental song by American singer-songwriter Bob Dylan, recorded in 1963 during the sessions for The Times They Are a-Changin' (1964). It was released on The Bootleg Series Volumes 1–3 (Rare & Unreleased) 1961–1991(1991).

Background and recording
"Suze (The Cough Song)" was written by Bob Dylan and recorded during the fifth of the sessions for his third album The Times They Are a-Changin' (1964). It was the first instrumental track ever recorded by Dylan. Dylan sings and plays guitar and harmonica, on the track, with Tom Wilson producing. Only one take was attempted. Dylan plays the guitar by fingerpicking in the Piedmont blues style that had previously been used by artists such as Elizabeth Cotten and Mississippi John Hurt. The guitar is in standard E tuning with a capoed at the fourth fret. In Harvey's survey of 70 of Dylan's early song recordings, Dylan uses a similar fingerpicking style in about 12 of them, including "Don't Think Twice, It's All Right" (1963) and "One Too Many Mornings" (1964).

The "Suze" of the title is thought to be Suze Rotolo, Dylan's girlfriend in the early 1960s. The addition of "The Cough Song" is presumed to be because Dylan starts coughing, before saying that the song ended before his coughing started ninety seconds into the recording and asking Wilson to fade it out. Scholar Todd Harvey noted that five sections of the song were recorded: a stanza, the stanza repeated, a bridge, and two further repetitions of the stanza. The coughing occurs, and the track is interrupted, as Dylan is about to return to the bridge. He plays harmonica in addition to guitare during the bridge and the stanza's return. According to Harvey, the stanzas and bridge "have four phrases each and, in duple meter, each phrase is four bars long. The Stanza has an ABAC phrase structure, and the bridge a DDEF phrase structure."

It was an outtake from the album sessions, and was later released on The Bootleg Series Volumes 1–3 (Rare & Unreleased) 1961–1991 on March 26, 1991. The track has a duration of one minute and 59 seconds. Harvey describes Dylan's guitar playing as "not a brilliant piece of fingerpicking", noting that there are "muffled tones and slips".

Journalist and author John Bauldie, who wrote the liner notes for The Bootleg Series Volumes 1–3 (Rare & Unreleased) 1961–1991, detected similarties between the track and "Mexican Rag" recorded by Jimmie Tarlton in 1930. He felt that it "loosely prefigures" "Nashville Skyline Rag", which appeared on Dylan's Nashville Skyline (1969).

Personnel
Musician
Bob Dylanvocals, guitar, harmonica

Technical
Tom Wilsonproducer
George Knuerrsound engineer
Pete Dauriasound engineer

References 

Sources
 

Songs written by Bob Dylan
Bob Dylan songs
1963 songs
Song recordings produced by Tom Wilson (record producer)